Yaseen Omar Barnawi (also spelled Yassin; born October 1, 1993) is a Saudi Arabian football player who plays as a right back for Al-Faisaly.

He joined Al-Qadisiyah FC in the Winter of 2015, having left the Al-Faisaly club of Harmah.

References
https://www.futhead.com/19/players/14114/yaseen-omar-barnawi/

External links
 

Living people
Saudi Arabian footballers
Saudi Arabia youth international footballers
1993 births
Sportspeople from Riyadh
Al-Shabab FC (Riyadh) players
Al-Faisaly FC players
Al Nassr FC players
Al-Qadsiah FC players
Ittihad FC players
Al-Taawoun FC players
Saudi Professional League players
Saudi First Division League players
Association football fullbacks